Sahr Lahai (born April 1, 1984 in Kenema, Sierra Leone) is a Sierra Leonean professional footballer. He is a defender and plays for Digenis Oroklinis in the Cypriot Third Division. He is also a member of the Sierra Leone national football team. He made his international for the Leone Stars in 2005. He was a regular member of the Sierra Leone team that participated at the 2005 Amílcar Cabral Cup (also known as the Zone 2).

Lahai began his football career with Giant F.C. in the Sierra Leone National Premier League in 2003. He signed a contract with Cyprus club Ethnikos Achnas in 2008.

External links

1984 births
Living people
Association football midfielders
Sierra Leonean footballers
Sierra Leone international footballers
Sierra Leonean expatriate footballers
Cypriot First Division players
Cypriot Second Division players
Ethnikos Achna FC players
Digenis Oroklinis players
Expatriate footballers in Cyprus
People from Kenema